Psigida is a genus of moths in the family Saturniidae first described by Oiticica in 1959.

Species
Psigida basalis (Michener, 1952)
Psigida walkeri (Grote, 1867)

References

Ceratocampinae